Bhagirathi Express (13103/13104) is a normal Mail/Express type train of Indian Railways linking Kolkata with the Murshidabad district in the state of West Bengal. This is a short-distance running express and covers its journey within a day. This train is very popular among tourists who use it to go for weekend trip to the historical town of Murshidabad. This train covers 227.6 kilometers of distance at a speed of 49 km/h and through its journey it passes through important stations like Ranaghat, Krishnanagar, Bethuadahari, Plassey, Beldanga, Berhampore, Murshidabad, Jiaganj, Lalgola.

Facilities 
AC chair car, Second class sitting, General type of coaches are available in this train. All the classes except general class requires prior reservation. Tatkal scheme is available in this train, whereas pantry car facility is not available. Throughout its journey it is hauled by WAP-5 or WAP-7 class of locomotive.

Train detail

Bhagirathi Express (13103) leaves Sealdah at 6:20pm via Ranaghat (7:53pm), Krishnanagar (8:22pm), Bethuadahari (8:45pm), Plassey (9:08pm), Beldanga (9:28pm), Berhampore court (9:49pm), Murshidabad (10:04pm), Jiaganj (10:12pm), Bhagwangola (10:23pm) and reaches Lalgola at 11:05pm. Down Bhagirathi Express leaves Lalgola at 5:40am in morning, reaches Bhagwangola at 5:51am, Jiaganj at 6:03am, Murshidabad at 6:11am, Berhampore court at 6:30am, Beldanga at 6:48am, Plassey at 7:10am, Bethudahari at 7:34am, Krishnanagar at 8:12, Ranaghat at 8:50am and reaches Sealdah at 10:40am on the same day.

References

Transport in Kolkata
Named passenger trains of India
Rail transport in West Bengal
Express trains in India